Armand Horace Cote (1909–1980) was a politician from Rhode Island.  He served as the state's secretary of state and as its lieutenant governor.

Biography
Cote was born in Central Falls, Rhode Island on April 19, 1909. He was a lifelong Democrat.

In 1940 he was elected as Secretary of State of Rhode Island, and served eight two year terms from January 1941 to January 1957.

He was a delegate to the Democratic National Convention from Rhode Island in 1948, 1952 (alternate) and in 1960.

In 1956 he was elected Lieutenant Governor of Rhode Island and served under Governor Dennis J. Roberts from January 1957 to January 1959.

He was a candidate for the Democratic nomination for governor of Rhode Island in 1958 and 1960 but was defeated in the primary election both times.

He was of French Canadian ancestry and was a Roman Catholic.  He was married to Estelle Pauline Beauregard (1906-2000).

Lieutenant Governor Cote died in April 1980.

References

External links
Dwight D. Eisenhower correspondence from the Rhode Island State Archives

Lieutenant Governors of Rhode Island
Rhode Island Democrats
1909 births
1980 deaths